The Drakoneras or Dhragonares form the northerly grouping of the Echinades islands, which are part of the Ionian Islands group of Greece. The name comes from the island Drakonera (Dhragonára) which is the chief island of the Drakoneras.

Echinades
Landforms of the Ionian Islands (region)
Landforms of Ithaca
Archipelagoes of Greece